Knefastia dalli, common name Dall's turrid, is a species of sea snail, a marine gastropod mollusk in the family Pseudomelatomidae, the turrids and allies.

Description
The length of the shell varies between 40 mm and 70 mm.

Distribution
This species occurs in the Sea of Cortez, Western Mexico.

References

 Bartsch, 1944; Proceedings of the Biological Society of Washington 57:28
 Audubon - Field Guide to North American Shells;

External links
 
 Gastropods.com: Knefastia dalli
 Malacologia v. 20 (1980-1981) p. 426;  Knefastia dalli : radula

dalli
Gastropods described in 1944